Dodonian Zeus or Zeus of Dodonia may refer to either of two figures who were worshipped at Dodona, the oldest oracle of the ancient Greeks:

Zeus Naos ("Zeus of the Naiads")
Zeus Bouleus ("Zeus the Counselor")

Dodona was an ancient oracle located in the region of Epirus in northwestern Greece (“Dodona”, Encyclopædia Britannica). The word Epirus means infinite Earth. The Greeks saw Eprius as a wilderness filled with barbarians ("Athens Greece Guide"). The ruins are located in Dramisos, near Tsacharovista (Ewegen). The name of the oracle is derived from Dodone, which is an oceanic nymph (Nicol, page 128). Dodone gets its name, according to commentaries originally by Epaphroditos, from Dodona, one of the Nymphai Okeanides.

It was created to honor the Greek God Zeus. At Dodona, Zeus was known as “Zeus Bouleus”. Which means Zeus the Counselor and “Zeus Naios” (also spelt as “Naos”). The translation of Naios means the god of spring. This was fitting because there was a spring located near the oracle. In addition, there was a sacred tree outside the temple, which was used by the priests. The priests, called Selloi, were known for sleeping on the ground and not washing their feet (Sacks, et al.). They interpreted the rustling of the leaves as divine messages from Zeus (Nicol, page 128). The priests would interpret the rustling leaves for a certain cost, and the outcome of this prediction improved with an increased fare (Ewegen). In Greek inscriptions found on the site, they mention Dione as well as Zeus Naios. Dione has been mentioned in several texts with regards to the oracle at Dodona. Dione as a name is the feminine form of Zeus ("DIONE.").  In most texts Zeus’ wife is identified as the goddess Hera, however Dione has been mentioned as the mother of Zeus’ daughter Aphrodite. In other cases Dione is solely mention as the daughter of Oceanus, and some writers have said she is the mother of Dionysus ("Dione"). Therefore, it is thought that Dodona was built for both Dione as well as Zeus (Kristensen, William Brede, 1960). Furthermore, Dodona served as both a political center as well as a religious sanctuary, although it was second to the oracles of Apollo in Delphi.

Alongside Zeus, Titan Dione was worshiped at Dodona. In some older stories Diona, not Hera, is the mother of Aphrodite. Diona’s name is the feminine version of Zeus (Dios).  She had three priestess at her shrine known as the Peleiades or Doves. The name came from Diona’s daughter Aphrodite who had a sacred dove. The Peleiades had the ability to read prophesy:
Perhaps there was something exceptional about the flight of the three pigeons from which the priestesses [of Dione at Dodona] were wont to make observations and to prophesy. It is further said that in the language of the Molossians and the Thesprotians, old women are called 'peliai' (doves) and old men 'pelioi.' And perhaps the much talked of Peleiades were not birds, but three old women who busied themselves about the temple.

The earliest mention of Dodona in Greek literature was in Homer's Iliad, which describes the priests (Selloi) as having unwashed feet who slept on the ground. In addition, the poem indicates that Achilles prayed to the “High Zeus, Lord of Dodona”.Iliad, Encyclopædia Britannica Online Academic Edition. Encyclopædia Britannica Inc., 2013. Web. Accessed 4 Apr. 2013.</ref>

The ancient Greek epic “Catalogues of Women Fragment 97” by Hesiod in the 8th or 7th century BCE, describes the Dodona:
There is a land Hellopia with much glebe and rich meadows, and rich in flocks and shambling kine. There dwell men who have many sheep and many oxen, and they are in number past telling, tribes of mortal men. And there upon its border is built a city, Dodona; and Zeus loved it and appointed it to be his oracle, reverenced by men . . . And they [the doves] lived in the hollow of an oak (phêgou). From them men of earth carry away all kinds of prophecy, whosoever fares to that spot and questions the deathless god, and comes bringing gifts with good omens." (Hesiod)

The oracle is also mentioned in Odyssey XIV. when Odysseus went to Dodona to hear from Zeus at the oak of the God (Nicol, page 135). Plato’s Phaedrus also mentions the oracle at Dodona (Jowett) as it says:
That the words of the oak in the holy place of Zeus at Dodona were the first prophetic utterances (Nicol, page 143).

The Greek historian mentioned the oracle at Dodona:
And after a time the Pelasgians consulted the Oracle at Dodona about the names, for this prophetic seat is accounted to be the most ancient of the Oracles which are among the Hellenes, and at that time it was the only one.

A fragment of Hediodic literature describes Dodona as a district of “corn fields, herds and flocks of shepherds… where Zeus dwells in the stem of an oak”. Herodotus notes he learned through a local legend that an Egyptian priestess who had been taken away by the Phoenicians founded the oracles. Therefore, the priestesses of the oracle are often referred to as doves to represent the Egyptian lost priestess  ("Encyclopædia Britannica, 11th Edition, Volume 8, Slice 5 "Dinard" to "Dodsworth" " 372). According to Strabo the oak tree is thought to be the first plant created that could provide a food supply. Strabo notes that the same geographer believes that the doves “are observed for the purposes of augury, just as there were some seers who divined from ravens." A legend regarding Dodona depicts the ship sailed by Jason and the Argonauts (the Argo) had the “gift of prophecy” because it had a piece of the sacred oak from Dodona ("Ancient/ Classical History")
Sent to fetch the fleece, Jason called in the help of Argus, son of Phrixus; and Argus, by Athena's advice, built a ship of fifty oars named Argo after its builder; and at the prow Athena fitted in a speaking timber from the oak of Dodona. When the ship was built, and he inquired of the oracle, the god gave him leave to assemble the nobles of Greece and sail away.(Rhod)

Dodona rapidly expanded, early in the 4th century BCE: a temple was built to worship Zeus; and King Pyrrhus developed festivals and games to be held every four years during the 3rd century. Events included athletics and musical competitions. A wall was built to protect the sanctuary and holy tree. At the same time temples were built to honor Heracles and Diona. The last addition to Dodona was the theatre, which had remarkable features such as a stone floor and wood proscenium. In recent times, archaeologists have discovered ancient buildings dating to the 4th century BCE, during King Pyrrhus’ rule. In 219 BCE, the Aetolians invaded and ravaged the city and the oracle. Although King Philip V of Macedon assisted the Epirotes in rebuilding the oracle, leaving behind more extravagant temples and, in addition, a stadium. In 167 BCE, Epirus was conquered by the Romans. In 31 BCE, Emperor Augustus rebuilt the sanctuary, and it is documented as active until CE 391, during the rule of the Christian emperor Theodosius I, when the sacred tree was cut down and the oracle closed.

References

Modern sources
"Dodona." Encyclopædia Britannica. Encyclopædia Britannica Online Academic Edition. Encyclopædia Britannica Inc., 2013. Web. Accessed 3 Apr. 2013. <http://www.britannica.com/EBchecked/topic/167610/Dodona>.
"Dione". Encyclopædia Britannica. Encyclopædia Britannica Online. Encyclopædia Britannica Inc., 2013. Web. 4 Apr. 2013 <http://www.britannica.com/EBchecked/topic/164202/Dione>. Accessed April 2, 2013.
"DIONE." Theoi. N.p. Web. Accessed 4 Apr 2013. <http://www.theoi.com/Titan/TitanisDione.html>.
Encyclopædia Britannica, 11th Edition, Volume 8, Slice 5 "Dinard" to "Dodsworth". 11th. VIII. 372. Print.
Jowett, Benjamin . "The Internet Classics Archive." Phaedrus . N.p.. Web. Accessed 4 Apr 2013. <http://classics.mit.edu/Plato/phaedrus.html>.
Magal, Shmue. Greek Theater. 2009. Photograph. ARTstorWeb. Accessed 4 Apr 2013. <http://library.artstor.org/library/welcome.html>
"The Oracle of Dodona," by D. M. Nicol. Greece & Rome, 2nd Ser., Vol. 5, No. 2. (Oct., 1958), pp. 128–143.
Sacks, David; Murray, Oswyn; Bunson, Margaret (1997). A Dictionary of the Ancient Greek World. New York, New York and Oxford, United Kingdom: Oxford University.

Ancient sources
"Ancient/ Classical History ." Sanctuary of Zeus at Dodona. About.com . Web. 4 Apr 2013. <http://ancienthistory.about.com/od/zeusmyth/g/102207DodonaZeu.htm>. Accessed April 2, 2013
Hesiod, Catalogues of Women Fragment 97 (from Scholiast on Sophocles Trachinae 1167) (trans. Evelyn-White).

External links
 Dodona - Pathways to Ancient Myth

Epirus
Epithets of Zeus